St John the Theologian's Church, Norwich is a Grade I listed parish church first part of the Church of England, then a Greek Orthodox Church, and finally to be re-opened again for secular use, in Norwich. It was also known as St John Sepulchre.

History

The church is medieval. After being declared redundant by the Church of England the building was taken over by the Greek Orthodox Church. After being closed again, discussions are underway to re-open the church for secular wedding ceremonies.

Organ

A specification of the organ can be found on the National Pipe Organ Register.

References

John
Churches in Norwich
Grade I listed buildings in Norfolk
Greek Orthodox churches in the United Kingdom